"The Suicide" is the 32nd episode of the sitcom Seinfeld, of which it was the fifteenth episode of the third season. It first aired on January 29, 1992.

The episode features the first on-screen appearance of Newman, portrayed by Wayne Knight. He had previously been portrayed, in voice only, by Larry David in the seventh episode of the second season, "The Revenge", where ironically enough Newman attempts suicide himself by threatening to jump off the roof of the building.

"The Suicide" features the first of two references George makes to his brother. Like Jerry's sister, mentioned for the first and only time in "The Chinese Restaurant", his sibling is never seen on-screen.

Plot
Elaine needs to fast before an ulcer test, so she tries starving herself three days before the test. After his neighbor Martin (C.E. Grimes) tries to commit suicide and ends up in a coma, Jerry is hit on by his girlfriend, Gina (Gina Gallego), while at the hospital. Elaine and George visit a psychic, who warns George to cancel his vacation to the Cayman Islands. When Elaine rebukes her for smoking while pregnant, the psychic kicks them out before telling George why he should cancel.

Jerry becomes worried when Newman (a fellow resident and friend of Martin's) sees Jerry with Gina. Later, in the comatose Martin's hospital room, Newman hints to Jerry that he will tell Martin what's been going on with Jerry and Gina, while Kramer is in there to tell Martin to give him back his vacuum cleaner. Jerry attempts to buy Newman off with the extra Drake's coffee cake that he has; however, Elaine burst in, now ravenous from her fast, takes it and devours it. Martin awakens from his coma and Newman promptly tells him everything while he chokes Jerry. Meanwhile, George finds Rula the psychic in another hospital room as she is going into labor. He tries to discover from her the reason why he shouldn't go to the Caymans; however, she is taken away to give birth before she can divulge it. Terrified, George sells his ticket to Kramer.

While in the Caymans, Kramer plays nude backgammon with Elle Macpherson, who was there for a shooting of Sports Illustrateds swimsuit issue. Upon his return he explains to George that he was mildly stung on the foot by a jellyfish, and theorizes that this is why the psychic didn't want George to go on the trip. George and Jerry leave to have dinner with Elaine (who had to reschedule her appointment) while Kramer rushes back to call Elle.

References

External links 
 

Seinfeld (season 3) episodes
1992 American television episodes
Television episodes about suicide